Tatianne Ingrid Pires Cabral (born January 9, 1979) is a former Cape Verdean female basketball player.

External links
Profile at fiba.com

1979 births
Living people
Cape Verdean women's basketball players